Whynot is an unincorporated community located in Lauderdale County, Mississippi.

History
The area was first served by a post office called Whitesville, which was established June 23, 1852, with Isham K. Pringle as first postmaster. The name was changed to Why Not (two words) on December 30, 1852, and was finally discontinued September 30, 1933, with mail thereafter going to Meridian.

Notable natives
 David Ruffin, musician (the Temptations)

References

Unincorporated communities in Lauderdale County, Mississippi
Unincorporated communities in Mississippi
Meridian micropolitan area